Narpus concolor is a species in the family Elmidae ("riffle beetles"), in the order Coleoptera ("beetles").
It is found in North America.

References

Further reading
 Arnett, R. H. Jr., M. C. Thomas, P. E. Skelley and J. H. Frank. (eds.). (21 June 2002). American Beetles, Volume II: Polyphaga: Scarabaeoidea through Curculionoidea. CRC Press LLC, Boca Raton, Florida .
 Brown, Harley P. (1983). "A catalog of the Coleoptera of America North of Mexico, Family: Elmidae". United States Department of Agriculture, Agriculture Handbook, no. 529-50, x + 23 + i.
 LeConte, J. L., and G. H. Horn. (1881). "Descriptions of new species of North American Coleoptera". Transactions of the Kansas Academy of Science, vol. 7, 71–74.
 LeSage, L. / Bousquet, Y. (1991). "Family Elmidae - riffle beetles". Checklist of beetles of Canada and Alaska, 172–173.
 Poole, Robert W., and Patricia Gentili, eds. (1996). "Coleoptera". Nomina Insecta Nearctica: A Check List of the Insects of North America, vol. 1: Coleoptera, Strepsiptera, 41-820.
 Richard E. White. (1983). Peterson Field Guides: Beetles. Houghton Mifflin Company.
 Ross H. Arnett. (2000). American Insects: A Handbook of the Insects of America North of Mexico. CRC Press.

Elmidae